Michael Englmayr (died 1568) was a Roman Catholic prelate who served as Auxiliary Bishop of Passau (1561–1568).

Biography
On 24 Mar 1561, Michael Englmayr was appointed during the papacy of Pope Pius IV as Auxiliary Bishop of Passau and Titular Bishop of Symbalia. He served as Auxiliary Bishop of Passau until his death on 13 Jul 1568.

References 

16th-century German Roman Catholic bishops
Bishops appointed by Pope Pius IV
1568 deaths